Welten is a village in Heerlen, still retaining its village like appearance.

A couple of landmarks remain in Welten, including a church dating back to the 11th century though restored in the 19th century, and the Weltermolen (Weltermill), a watermill powered by the Geleenbeek.

The Weltermolen dates back to at least the 14th century.

Heerlen